Manteo High School is one of ten schools located in Dare County, North Carolina. The high school was named after the Native American chief Manteo, who assisted the Roanoke Colony. Renovations to the school were completed in 2007.

In addition to Manteo it serves Nags Head and other parts of Roanoke Island (including Wanchese) as well as portions of Dare County on the North Carolina mainland (including Manns Harbor and Stumpy Point).

History
In 2003 enrollment was over 1,200. In 2004 First Flight High School opened, relieving Manteo High, taking about 800 students. Enrollment at Manteo High was down to 530.

Sports

Manteo's sports teams play under the name "Redskins". The school has 21 athletic teams (including seven varsity teams and five junior varsity teams) that compete with other 1-A schools in the eastern part of North Carolina and across the state. They often compete with First Flight High School, which is in the same school district.

Mascot
The school's mascot is the Redskins. Decades of controversy surround the intention of the name, most notably in 2002 when the NC State Board of Education and State Advisory Council on Indian Education sent an action statement to the state's 117 school districts requesting they review their policies and procedures toward Indian mascots. Former State Board of Education member, Eddie Davis, spoke against the Redskins mascot during the public comment period of a Dare County Board of Education meeting in Sept 2008. Following the murder of George Floyd and the Washington Redskins name controversy in 2020, rival campaigns to either retire or retain the mascot circulated. In June, 2020 the chief of the local Algonquian Indians of NC Roanoke-Hatteras Council issued a statement requesting the mascot be removed. On Oct 13, 2020, the Dare County School Board voted to endorse the Manteo High School Redskins and Manteo Middle School Braves.

Notable alumni
George Ackles, professional basketball player
Marc Basnight, NC State Senator representing the 1st district from 1984–2011
Emanuel Davis, Canadian Football League player
Stan M. White, NC State Senator representing the 1st district from 2011–2012

References

Public high schools in North Carolina
Schools in Dare County, North Carolina
Roanoke Island